The Broadneck Peninsula is an area in Anne Arundel County, Maryland. The area is north of the Severn River, south of the Magothy River and west of the Chesapeake Bay.  At the lower end of the Broadneck Peninsula is the 4.3 mile Chesapeake Bay Bridge.

History
Broadneck is the site of Anne Arundel County's first European settlement in 1649. The first settlers were Puritans from Virginia who were invited by Maryland's proprietary ruler, Cecilius Calvert, 2nd Baron Baltimore, to settle on the western shore of the Chesapeake Bay.  The Virginia Puritans established a dispersed hamlet at the mouth of the Severn River which they called "Providence" or "Severn." It was centered on the north shore of the Severn, between Greenberry Point and Hackett's Point.  It was abandoned around 1670 in favor of Annapolis harbor.  During this time, the area formed by Mill and Whitehall Creeks was known as "Broadneck," a name which later was applied to the entire peninsula.

By the late 17th century, the hamlet of Providence had expanded up the Broadneck Peninsula, with plantations occupying much of the interior land.

Throughout the 18th and 19th centuries the land use of the Broadneck area remained rural, supporting large plantations of tobacco and diversified crops. Annapolis served as the market center for these farms.

The African-American community of Mulberry Hills was established after the Civil War for freed slaves who had lived and worked in the area prior to the war. Similar to Brown's Woods on the north shore of Mill Creek, Mulberry Hill was subdivided into approximately 5-acre subsistence farms.

Communities
The Broadneck Peninsula comprises several residential neighborhoods, including Arnold, Cape St. Claire, and St. Margaret's.  Two postal Zip Codes are assigned to the peninsula: Annapolis, 21409 and Arnold, 21012. The physical peninsula also includes most of Severna Park, 21146.

Education
Broadneck is served by the Anne Arundel County Public School System.

Elementary schools:
 Broadneck Elementary
 Belvedere Elementary
 Arnold Elementary
 Cape St. Claire Elementary
 Windsor Farm Elementary
Jones Elementary

Middle schools:
 Severn River Middle School
 Magothy River Middle School

High schools:
 Broadneck High School

Private schools:
 Chesapeake Academy

Colleges:
Anne Arundel Community College: Located in Arnold along College Parkway

Parks and trails

Sandy Point State Park: Located on the Broadneck Peninsula, this recreational park provides access to beaches and picnic areas that overlook the Chesapeake Bay.  The main marina has 22 boat launching ramps for boats and personal water craft.

Baltimore & Annapolis Trail: a rail trail connecting Annapolis to Glen Burnie and passing through Arnold.

Broadneck Peninsula Trail: The first phase of the development of this planned 8.7 mile east-west recreational trail began in 2012. When completed, the trail will link Sandy Point State Park with the B&A Trail in Arnold. The park will also provide links to Anne Arundel Community College, elementary and middle schools, Broadneck High School, Broadneck Library, and community parks.  The section will be a part of the American Discovery Trail.

Broadneck Park: This park contains baseball fields, a children's playground, a jogging trail and a dog park. The dog park has two enclosed areas for dogs.

Historic landmarks

Wroxeter on Severn: Built for chemical magnate Edwin Pugh Baugh in 1909, this 22 room mansion was built in a Tudor revival style.

Whitehall: Erected for Governor Horatio Sharpe, Whitehall Mansion was built between 1764 and 1765 on a 1,000 acre estate overlooking Whitehall Bay.

Waterways
 Magothy River (North Shore)
 Severn River (South Shore)
 Chesapeake Bay (East Shore)

North Shore (Upriver to downriver)

    Dividing Creek
    Mill Creek
    Cool Spring Creek
    Forked Creek
    Scheider's Cove
    Deep Creek
    Little Magothy
    Podickery Creek

South Shore (Upriver to downriver)
    Ringgold Cove
    Asquith Creek (Aisquith Creek)
    Ray's Pond
    Chase Creek
    Cool Spring Cove

Whitehall Bay (west to east)
    Mill Creek & Burley & Little Burley Creeks
    Providence Creek
    Minnow Creek
    Martin's Cove
    Whitehall Creek & Ridout Creek
    Meredith Creek & Jacks Cove
    Moss Pond (entrance eroded, looks like two coves)
    Westinghouse Bay (S of US 50 near Bay Bridge)
    Shorts Creek & Mezick Pond  (N of US 50, creek leads to pond with marina)

References

External links
NOAA Chart of Severn River
Chesapeake Bay Program Watershed Profile: Severn River
Severn River map   (Available from the Severn River Association)
Severn River history from Anne Arundel County web site
A. T. Davison and C. B. Rucker. Gems of the Severn (Severn River Commission, Annapolis, MD, 1988) Available from Scenic Rivers Land Trust, http://www.srlt.org
Broadneck Peninsula Trail
Broadneck Park information

Populated places in Anne Arundel County, Maryland